was a Japanese football player. He played for Japan national team.

Club career
Kondo was born in Tokyo on June 1, 1907. He played for Tokyo Imperial University LB was consisted of his alma mater Tokyo Imperial University players and graduates.

National team career
In August 1927, when Kondo was a Mito High School student, he was selected Japan national team for 1927 Far Eastern Championship Games in Shanghai. At this competition, on August 27, he debuted against Republic of China. On August 29, he also played against Philippines and Japan won this match. This is Japan national team first victory in International A Match. He played 2 games for Japan in 1927.

After retirement
After graduating from Tokyo Imperial University, Kondo retired and became a doctor. He served as a professor of Tokyo Women's Medical University and so on.

On February 9, 1991, Kondo died of intracranial hemorrhage in Yokosuka at the age of 83.

National team statistics

References

External links
 
 Japan National Football Team Database

1907 births
1991 deaths
University of Tokyo alumni
Association football people from Tokyo
Japanese footballers
Japan international footballers
Association football defenders
Deaths from intracranial haemorrhage